Torbjörn "Ebbot" Lundberg (born 26 February 1966) is a Swedish artist, songwriter and music producer who lives in Gothenburg, Sweden. From 1995 to 2012, he was the lead singer of The Soundtrack of Our Lives‚ which he co-founded with Björn Olsson and Ian Person. Lundberg was one of the founding members of the rock band Union Carbide Productions during 1986–1993. He has also produced a large number of bands like The Loons, Nymphet Noodlers, Nicolai Dunger, Onkel Kånkel, and Zoobox. He has made appearances or collaborated with Jane Birkin, Turbonegro, Nina Persson, The Cardigans, Teddybears, Trummor & Orgel and Olle Ljungström. He has appeared on the Late Show with David Letterman, Late Night with Conan O'Brien, Later... with Jools Holland and The Tonight Show with Jay Leno.

In 2012 he released his first solo album entitled There's Only One of Us Here. It is a 43-minute long, uninterrupted opus that was originally created in 2011 for the art project (In)Visible Dialogues organized by Per Hüttner and Elias Arnér.

Discography

Solo albums
 2012: There's Only One of Us Here (Kning Disk)
 2013: On The Other Side Of Light (Subliminal Sounds), with The New Alchemy including artist Per Svensson. (Per Svensson)
 2016: For the Ages to Come (Akashic Records), with The Indigo Children.

With The Soundtrack of Our Lives
 1996: Welcome to the Infant Freebase (Telegram Records)
 1998: Extended Revelation for the Psychic Weaklings of Western Civilization (Telegram Records)
 2001: Behind the Music (Telegram Records)
 2004: Origin Vol. 1 (Telegram Records)
 2008: Communion (Telegram Records)
 2012: Throw It to the Universe (Telegram Records)

With Union Carbide Productions
 1987: In the Air Tonight (Radium Records)
 1989: Financially Dissatisfied, Philosophically Trying (Radium Records)
 1991: From Influence to Ignorance (Radium Records)
 1992: Swing (Radium Records)

With 5 Billion in Diamonds
 2017: 5 Billion in Diamonds (100% Records)
 2020: Divine Accidents (Make Records)

References

1966 births
Living people
Swedish male singers
English-language singers from Sweden